Parbatbhai Patel is a Member of Parliament, Lok Sabha from Banaskantha constituency in Gujarat for its 16th Lok Sabha.

He was elected to the Lok Sabha, lower house of the Parliament of India from Banaskantha, Gujarat in the 2019 Indian general election as member of the Bharatiya Janata Party.

References

India MPs 2019–present
Lok Sabha members from Gujarat
Living people
Bharatiya Janata Party politicians from Gujarat
Gujarat MLAs 2012–2017
People from Patan district
Rashtriya Janata Party politicians
Gujarat MLAs 2017–2022
Gujarat University alumni
1948 births